Maasheybash is a mountain in the Altai Republic, Russia. At  it is the highest summit in the Northern Chuya Range, part of the Chuya Belki, Altai Mountains, South Siberian System. 

Description

Located in the area of Kosh-Agachsky District, it is one of the highest peaks of the Altai Mountains. Its geological composition is lava and tuff, as well as argillaceous and siliceous shale. The Masashey glacier, as well as kurums, descend from the slopes of the mountain.

See also
List of mountains and hills of Russia
List of Ultras of Central Asia

References

External links
View Maasheybash Peak Mashey Valley
The highest peaks in Russia

Mountains of the Altai Republic
Altai Mountains

ru:Маашейбаш